Cho Sung-jae (born March 13, 2001) is a South Korean swimmer.

Career
In August 2018, he represented South Korea at the 2018 Asian Games held in Indonesia. He competed in the 200m breaststroke event. He finished at rank 6 in the final.

In July 2019, he represented South Korea at the 2019 World Aquatics Championships held in Gwangju, South Korea. He competed in the 200m breaststroke event however he did not advance to compete in the semifinal.

In July 2021, he represented South Korea at the 2020 Summer Olympics held in Tokyo, Japan. He competed in the 100m breaststroke and 200m breaststroke events. In both events, he did not advance to compete in the semifinal.

References

External links
 
 

2001 births
Living people
Swimmers at the 2020 Summer Olympics
South Korean male breaststroke swimmers
Olympic swimmers of South Korea
Asian Games competitors for South Korea
Swimmers at the 2018 Asian Games
People from Ansan
Sportspeople from Gyeonggi Province
21st-century South Korean people